Mary Emmeline Godfrey (3 July 1913 - 30 April 2007) was an artist and art educator who became the first full-time African-American faculty member at Penn State University. She was hired in 1957 and served as an assistant professor of art education until her retirement in 1979.

Godfrey gained a bachelor of fine arts from the Pratt Institute and a master's degree from Columbia University and worked as the assistant state supervisor of art education for the Virginia Department of Education. In 1957, Dr. Viktor Lowenfeld, head of the newly formed Department of Art Education, College of Education, at The Pennsylvania State University, hired Godfrey as assistant professor of art education.

She served for 22 years, teaching courses in elementary and secondary art education, supervision, the history of art education, and introduction to crafts. She researched the design of art classrooms, studying Pennsylvania art education laboratories, art rooms, and facilities for junior high schools. Her artwork was exhibited in both Pennsylvania and Virginia.

Early life
Mary Godfrey was born on July 3, 1913 in the small southern town of Charlotte Court House, Virginia, and was one of eight children of Henry B. Godfrey and Louise (née Reid) Godfrey.  During an interview Godfrey states she was born in New York City. Godfrey's family maintained a farm in Charlotte Court House and a residence in New York City, where her father had established a business.

Godfrey’s older sister, Cleveland Community Activist and journalist, Stella Godfrey White Bigham, whose work promoted interracial understanding, was the first African American woman to sit on the Cleveland Transit System board.

Education
Godfrey entered the Pratt Institute Department of Teacher Training in Art Education in 1933, at the age of 20, and received a teaching certificate in 1937. Even though records indicate Godfrey received a BFA in art education, Pratt did not grant four-year bachelor's degree until 1938. The coursework Godfrey received during her four years was equivalent to a bachelor's degree. She was qualified to teach all phases of art in public and private school from elementary to the college level in any state.

Godfrey continued her education and received a master's degree from Columbia University Teachers College.

Career
After Godfrey graduated from Pratt Institute she became an art teacher/supervisor for Camden Public School in Camden, New Jersey from 1938-1947. In 1947, Godfrey became the first African American as the Assistant State Art Supervisor for Virginia State. Her job was to supervise the Black schools in the state and to promote art education.

Works
Two pieces of Godfrey's work, Art Lesson, oil on canvas, and Lady with Cat/Daybreak, watercolor, ink, and chalk on paper, were gifted by Godfrey's family to the Pennsylvania State University Palmer Museum of Art. Daybreak was included in the exhibition Those Who Taught: Selected Works by Former Faculty (May 20 - August 14, 2022), and Art Lesson was exhibited in Looking at Who We Are: The Palmer at 50 (September 23 - December 18, 2022).

References

Further reading
 Darryl B. Daisey: Penn State University African American Chronicles, 1899-2016 (2nd Revised Edition).
 Holt, A. (2017). Mary E. Godfrey (1913-2007): Penn State’s first African American full-time faculty member. Studies in Art Education, 58(3), 234–245. doi:10.1080/00393541.2017.1331088"

African-American academics
American art educators
1913 births
2007 deaths
African-American women artists
Pennsylvania State University faculty
Teachers College, Columbia University alumni
Pratt Institute alumni
20th-century American educators
20th-century American women artists
American women academics
20th-century African-American women
20th-century African-American people
20th-century African-American artists
21st-century African-American people
21st-century African-American women